"Lento" (English: "Slow") is a song by Mexican singer Thalía and Cuban duo Gente de Zona, from Thalía's fourteenth studio album, Valiente. It was released by Sony Music Latin as the album's third single on September 27, 2018.

Music video
The video for Lento was released on the same day as the song. It shows Thalía escaping the paparazzi and dancing at a beach party with Gente de Zona. The video was filmed in the beaches in Miami.

Commercial Performance
The song peaked at number 5 on the Billboard Latin Digital Songs charts becoming Thalía's highest peak on that chart. The song also topped the Tropical Digital Song Sales chart in Billboard. The song entered charts in several countries in Latin America, Spain, the U.S., and Hungary.

Charts

Weekly charts

Year-end charts

References 

 

Thalía songs
2018 singles
Sony Music Latin singles
Spanish-language songs
2018 songs
Songs written by Julio Reyes Copello
Songs written by Edgar Barrera
Song recordings produced by Sergio George